Nick Papac (May 18, 1935 – April 18, 2009) was an American football quarterback who played for one season in the American Football League. He played college football at California and Fresno State.

Early life and high school
Papac was born in Fresno, California and grew up in Sanger, California and attended Sanger Union High School. He was the Apaches' starting quarterback ahead of future Raiders teammate Tom Flores.

College career
Papac began his collegiate career at California. He played two seasons, mostly on the junior varsity team, with the Golden Bears before joining the Army after his sophomore year. He was stationed at Fort Carson and quarterbacked the base's football team for two years. After being discharged from the Army, Papac enrolled at Fresno State University and played two seasons for the Bulldogs and was the team's starting quarterback.

Professional career
After going undrafted after the end of his collegiate career Papac was signed by the Oakland Raiders. As a rookie he primarily served as Tom Flores's backup. He finished the season with 13 of 44 pass attempts completed for 173 yards with two touchdowns and seven interceptions and also rushed for 28 yards and one touchdown. Papac was released by the Raiders during the following offseason. He was signed by the Los Angeles Rams but was cut during training camp.

References

External links
Oakland Raiders profile

1935 births
2009 deaths
Players of American football from California
Sportspeople from Fresno County, California
American football quarterbacks
California Golden Bears football players
Fresno State Bulldogs football players
Oakland Raiders players
People from Sanger, California